County Bridge No. 45 is a historic Pratt Through Truss bridge located in Washington Township, Daviess County, Indiana.  It was built by the Indiana Bridge Company and erected in 1903.  It carries County Road 150N over the White River and into Knox County, Indiana. The bridge consists of three 140 foot long spans on concrete abutments, with an overall length of 422 feet.

It was added to the National Register of Historic Places in 2006.

References

Road bridges on the National Register of Historic Places in Indiana
Truss bridges in the United States
Bridges completed in 1903
Transportation buildings and structures in Daviess County, Indiana
National Register of Historic Places in Daviess County, Indiana
Transportation buildings and structures in Knox County, Indiana
National Register of Historic Places in Knox County, Indiana